Lennon Legend: The Very Best of John Lennon is the third official compilation album of John Lennon's solo career, coming after 1975's Shaved Fish and 1982's The John Lennon Collection. Because neither collection spanned Lennon's releases up to and including 1984's Milk and Honey, Lennon Legend: The Very Best of John Lennon – considered the definitive Lennon retrospective – was compiled. It was released in the UK in 1997 through Parlophone and early 1998 in the US by EMI Records.

Lennon Legend: The Very Best of John Lennon peaked at number 4 on the UK Albums Chart and certified 2× Platinum by the BPI in May 1998. The album has also certified Platinum in the US and Canada as of December 2008. In the history of Japanese Oricon chart, Lennon Legend has been one of the longest charting albums that failed to reach top 40, selling more than 190,000 copies up to late 2006.

The album re-entered the UK Chart on 18 June 2007, almost ten years after its release, at number 30. The album also appeared in a commercial for Apple's iPod Touch. A DVD with the same name was also released in 2003 as a series of remastered, remixed & new music videos with Dolby Digital 5.1 Surround Sound audio mixes.

Track listing
All songs written and composed by John Lennon, except where noted.

"Imagine" – 3:02
"Instant Karma!" – 3:20
"Mother" * – 3:53
"Jealous Guy" – 4:14
"Power to the People" – 3:17
"Cold Turkey" – 5:01
"Love" – 3:23
"Mind Games" – 4:11
"Whatever Gets You thru the Night" – 3:19
"#9 Dream" – 4:46
"Stand By Me" (Ben E. King, Jerry Leiber, Mike Stoller) – 3:27
"(Just Like) Starting Over" – 3:55
"Woman" – 3:26
"Beautiful Boy (Darling Boy)" – 4:00
"Watching the Wheels" – 3:31
"Nobody Told Me" – 3:33
"Borrowed Time" – 4:30
"Working Class Hero" – 3:49
"Happy Xmas (War Is Over)" (Yoko Ono, John Lennon) – 3:33
"Give Peace a Chance" – 4:52
* US single version, issued in December 1970, for the first time released on CD.

Charts and certifications

Charts

Year-end charts

Certifications

References

1997 greatest hits albums
Compilation albums published posthumously
Albums produced by Jack Douglas (record producer)
John Lennon compilation albums
Parlophone compilation albums